Disa virginalis is a species of orchid found in Southwest Cape Province, South Africa.

References

External links

 
 

virginalis
Orchids of South Africa